Katella High School is a public high school in Anaheim, California, located in the Southeast Anaheim region of the city and is part of the Anaheim Union High School District. It serves 2,700 students in grades nine through twelve. The school's mascot is the Knights.

Notable alumni
Brandon Barnes - Major League Baseball
Jason Boesel - drummer
Carl Macek - anime producer, director, writer and performer 
Nick Ramirez - Major League Baseball pitcher
Ed Royce - U.S. Congress representative
Linda Sánchez - U.S. Congress representative
Loretta Sanchez - U.S. Congress representative
Jerry Spradlin - Major League Baseball pitcher
Dave Wilson - National Football League quarterback
Jaret Wright - Major League Baseball pitcher
Joe Lacob - Entertainment Executive, Owner of Golden State Warriors
Rick Rickertsen - Financier, Film Producer, Stanford Golf
Brad Eberhard   - Artist 
Jeff Phelps Founder & CEO iWorkGlobal

References

External links
School website
Anaheim Union High School District

High schools in Anaheim, California
Public high schools in California
1966 establishments in California
Educational institutions established in 1966